Ånn is a village in Åre Municipality, Jämtland, Sweden. In 2005, Ånn had 70 residents.

References

Populated places in Åre Municipality
Jämtland